The Second Guangxi campaign was a three-front Chinese counter offensive to retake the last major Japanese stronghold in Guangxi province, South China during April–August 1945. The campaign was successful, and plans were being made to mop up the remaining scattered Japanese troops in the vicinity of Shanghai and the east coast when the Soviets invaded Manchuria, the Americans dropped atomic bombs on Hiroshima and Nagasaki, leading to Japan's surrender and ending the eight-year-long Second Sino-Japanese War.

See also 
 Order of battle: second Guangxi campaign

References 

Guangxi
China in World War II
1945 in China
1945 in Japan
Military history of Guangxi
August 1945 events in Asia
Guangxi